Vibecke Caroline Gedde-Dahl (born 3 November 1973) is a Norwegian alpine skier. She was born in Oslo. She competed at the 1994 Winter Olympics.

References

External links

1973 births
Living people
Alpine skiers from Oslo
Norwegian female alpine skiers
Olympic alpine skiers of Norway
Alpine skiers at the 1994 Winter Olympics